The Royal Bridge (Spanish: Puente Real) is a bridge in Badajoz, Spain. It crosses over the Guadiana.

History and description 
Promoted by the Junta de Extremadura, the foundation stone was laid on 28 September 1992. The project consists of a cable-stayed bridge over the Guadiana with the following spans: (136 + 88 + 32) m. The bridge is continued by a viaduct displaying six spans of 32 m, making a total length of 452 m. The bridge platform, with 2 lanes in each direction, has a width of 23 m. The main pylon, made of reinforced concrete, stands 81.20 m high. It features 28 tension cables.

It was opened on 23 December 1994. Following its inauguration, it became the busiest bridge in the municipality.

References 

Bridges over the Guadiana River
Buildings and structures in Badajoz
Bridges in Extremadura
Cable-stayed bridges in Spain
Road bridges in Spain
Bridges completed in 1994